Kuthannur-I  is a village in Palakkad district in the state of Kerala, India.

Demographics
 India census, Kuthannur-I had a population of 16,732 with 8,039 males and 8,693 females.

References

Villages in Palakkad district